Steptoe Butte is a quartzite island jutting out of the silty loess of the Palouse hills in Whitman County, Washington, in the northwest United States.

Steptoe Butte and nearby Kamiak Butte comprise Steptoe and Kamiak Buttes National Natural Landmark. This  area, designated in 1965, includes land in state and countyownership.

Geology
The rock that forms the butte is over 400 million years old, in contrast with the 15–7 million year old Columbia River Basalts that underlie the rest of the Palouse.  Steptoe Butte has become an archetype, as isolated protrusions of bedrock, such as summits of hills or mountains, in lava flows have come to be called "steptoes". Steptoe and Kamiak Buttes are outliers of Idaho's Coeur d'Alene Mountains.
Mount Spokane is easily visible,  to the north.

History

The butte was named after Colonel Edward Steptoe. A hotel built by James S. "Cashup" Davis stood atop the butte from 1888 to 1908, burning down in 1911. The east,south and west portions of the butte were purchased in 2016 by two couples Kent and Elaine Bassett, and Ray and Joan Folwell. The owners planned to protect their  of land from development, eventually donating it to the state. This plan came to fruition when they sold the land to the Washington State Department of Natural Resources in December 2021.

Activities and amenities

A narrow paved road winds around the butte, leading to a parking area at the summit. The park offers picnicking facilities and an interpretive wayside exhibit. Popular activities include sight-seeing, paragliding, hang gliding, kite and model airplane flying, and photography.

Gallery

References

External links

Steptoe Butte State Park Heritage Site Washington State Parks and Recreation Commission 
Steptoe Butte State Park Map Washington State Parks and Recreation Commission

State parks of Washington (state)
Parks in Whitman County, Washington
Landforms of Whitman County, Washington
Quartzite formations
Buttes of Washington (state)